East Side Story is the second studio album by American rapper Kid Frost. It was released in 1992 through Virgin Records, making it his final album for the label and also his last album under the alias of 'Kid Frost', as he would change his name to 'Frost'. Production was handled by Will Roc, Tony G., Mr. Mixx of 2 Live Crew, Geoff Rios, Mike Greene, K-Cut and Frost himself. The album features guest appearances from Rich Garcia, Boo-Yaa T.R.I.B.E., A.L.T., Denetria Champ, Joe Harris, MC Eiht of Compton's Most Wanted, Prince Teddy and Scringer Ranks.

The album peaked at number 73 on the Billboard 200 albums chart and at number 54 on the Top R&B/Hip-Hop Albums chart in the United States. It spawned three singles: "No Sunshine", "Thin Line" and "Another Firme Rola (Bad Cause I'm Brown)". Its lead single, "No Sunshine", made it to #95 on the Billboard Hot 100 singles chart and #20 on the Hot Rap Songs chart. "Thin Line" only reached #11 on the Hot Rap Songs chart, and "Another Firme Rola (Bad Cause I'm Brown)" wasn't charted.

Track listing

Personnel

Arturo Molina, Jr. – rap vocals, producer (tracks: 1-2, 4-6)
Aaron Tyler – rap vocals (track 4)
Alvin Trivette – rap vocals (track 4)
Paul Devoux – rap vocals (track 5)
Prince Teddy – vocals (track 6)
DeNetria Champ – vocals (track 7)
Rich Garcia – vocals (tracks: 9, 12, 17)
Scringer Ranks – vocals (track 10)
Joe Harris – vocals (track 14)
Boo-Yaa T.R.I.B.E. – backing vocals (tracks: 5, 7)
Bobby Loco – additional backing vocals (track 5)
Ken Strong – additional backing vocals (track 5), drums (track 16), additional drums (track 7)
Mike Sanna – additional backing vocals (track 5)
William L. Griffin – keyboards (tracks: 1, 5, 7), producer (tracks: 1, 5, 7, 16)
Ronnie King – keyboards (track 9)
Lafayette Trey Stone III – guitar (track 14)
Mike "Crazy Neck" Sims – guitar & bass (track 15)
Eric C. Ajaye – bass (tracks: 3, 6)
Danny Devoux – bass (tracks: 5, 7)
Anton Pukshansky – bass guitar (track 10)
Mitch Rafel – saxophone (tracks: 2, 7)
Danny "Dice" Padilla – saxophone (track 17)
Todd Alexander – drums & percussion (tracks: 1, 4), coordinator
"Professor" Dwight Baldwin – percussion (tracks: 2, 12, 17)
Antonio Gonzalez – percussion (track 17), producer (tracks: 9, 12, 17), additional producer (track 14)
Ralph Medrano – scratches (tracks: 2, 15, 16)
Geoff Rios – producer (tracks: 2, 14, 15)
Mike Greene – producer (tracks: 2, 14, 15)
David P. Hobbs – producer (tracks: 3, 4, 6)
Kevin McKenzie – producer & mixing (track 10)
Mark Williams – coordinator
Stephen Marcussen – mastering
Steve Gerdes – art direction & design
Tom Dolan – design
Mark Machado – illustration

Chart history

References

External links

1992 albums
Frost (rapper) albums
Virgin Records albums
Gangsta rap albums by American artists
Albums produced by K-Cut (producer)
Albums produced by Mr. Mixx